David Harum is a 1934 American comedy film directed by James Cruze and written by Walter Woods. The film stars Will Rogers, Louise Dresser, Evelyn Venable, Kent Taylor, Stepin Fetchit, Noah Beery, Sr. and Roger Imhof. The film was released on March 3, 1934, by Fox Film Corporation.

Plot

Cast        
Will Rogers as David Harum
Louise Dresser as Polly Harum
Evelyn Venable as Ann Madison
Kent Taylor as John Lennox
Stepin Fetchit as Sylvester Swifty
Noah Beery, Sr. as Gen. Woolsey
Roger Imhof as Edwards
Frank Melton as Caruthers Elwin
Charles Middleton as Deacon Perkins
Sarah Padden as Widow Cullon
Lillian Stuart as Sairy
Jack Mower as Townsman (uncredited)

Reception
The film was one of Fox's biggest hits of the year.

References

External links 
 

1934 films
1930s English-language films
Fox Film films
American comedy films
1934 comedy films
Films directed by James Cruze
American black-and-white films
1930s American films